Shiv Sena or Shivsena may refer to various political parties:


India
 Balasahebanchi Shiv Sena, a Hindu nationalist political party formed in 2022
 Shiv Sena, a defunct Marathi regionalist political party
 Shiv Sena (Uddhav Balasaheb Thackeray), a secular Hindutva political party founded in 2022

Nepal
 Nepal Shivsena, a Hindutva political party founded in 1999
 Shivsena Nepal, a Hindu political party founded in 1990